The Exiles Memorial Center is located in Estoril, Portugal and houses a permanent exhibition of photographs, documentation and objects related to the history of refugees who stayed in the Cascais/Estoril area of Portugal during the period between 1936 and 1955. The Memorial Center, inaugurated in February 1999, is situated above the Estoril post office in a building designed by Portuguese architect Adelino Nunes. The building opened in 1942. The main objective of the Memorial Center is to "evoke the memory of one of the most important events in [Portugal's] history: to have represented a place of refuge, waiting and passage of thousands of exiles and refugees in the context of European conflicts" most notably during World War II. The Memorial Center is open to the public.

List of refugees
List (not exhaustive) of notable people who resided in Cascais by profession, place and duration.

Artists
Jean-Claude van Itallie (playwright). Pensão Royal, 08.07.1940 – 28.09.1940.
Franz Werfel (author, songwriter). Grande Hotel d'Itália, 18.09.1940 – 04.10.1940.
Alma Mahler (author, songwriter). Grande Hotel d'Itália, 18.09.1940 – 04.10.1940.
Max Ernst (painter, sculptor). Grande Hotel d'Itália, 12.06.1940 – 24.07.1940.
Peggy Guggenheim (art collector). Grande Hotel d'Itália, 12.06.1940 – 24.07.1940.
Margret Boveri (author, journalist). Hotel Atlântico, 16.01.1944 – 07.02.1944.
Miloš Crnjanski (Milos Crujanski) (author). Hotel de Inglaterra, 19.05.1941 – 20.08.1941
Max Ophüls (Max Ophuls) (director). Pensão de Luxo Casa Mar e Sol, 21.07.1941 – 1941.

Chess players
Alexander Alekhine. Hotel Palácio, 18.01.1940 – 11.02.1940.

Industrial/Aviation/Engineering
Paul-Louis Weiller. Grande Hotel Monte Estoril, 15.08.1940 – 23.08.1940; Hotel Atlântico, 23.08.1940 – 25.09.1940.

Models 
Aliki Diplarakou. Grande Hotel Monte Estoril, 15.08.1940 – 23.08.1940; Hotel Atlântico, 23.08.1940 – 01.10.1940.

Philosophers
Isaiah Berlin. Hotel Palácio, 19.10.1940 – 24.10.1940.

Politicians
Victor Bodson. Pensão Zenith, 30-08-1940 – 2.10.1940.
Joseph Bech. Chalet Posser de Andrade, 2.10.1940 – 25.09.1940.
Pierre Dupong. Chalet Posser de Andrade, 25.06.1940 – 25.09.1940.
Jacques Stern. Hotel do Parque, 21.08.1940 – 01.09.1940.

Royalty
Charlotte, Grand Duchess of Luxembourg (Grã-Duquesa Carlota do Luxemburgo). Casa Santa Maria and Chalet Posser de Andrade, 25.06.1940 – 03.10.1940.
Prince Felix of Bourbon-Parma (Príncipe Félix de Bourbon-Parma). Casa Santa Maria and Chalet Posser de Andrade, 25.06.1940 – 10.07.1940.
Jean, Grand Duke of Luxembourg (Príncipe herdeiro Jean do Luxemburgo). Casa Santa Maria and Chalet Posser de Andrade, 25.06.1940 – 10.07.1940
Infanta Marie Anne of Portugal (Grã-Duquesa Marie-Anne do Luxemburgo). Casa Santa Maria and Chalet Posser de Andrade, 25.06.1940 – 10.07.1940.
Princess Elisabeth, Duchess of Hohenberg (Princesa Elisabeth do Luxemburgo). Casa Santa Maria and Chalet Posser de Andrade, 25.06.1940 – 10.07.1940.
Princess Marie Adelaide of Luxembourg (Princesa Marie Adelaide do Luxemburgo). Casa Santa Maria and Chalet Posser de Andrade, 25.06.1940 – 10.07.1940.
Princess Marie Gabriele of Luxembourg (Princesa Marie Gabrielle do Luxemburgo). Casa Santa Maria and Chalet Posser de Andrade, 25.06.1940 – 10.07.1940.
Prince Charles of Luxembourg (Príncipe Charles do Luxemburgo). Casa Santa Maria and Chalet Posser de Andrade, 25.06.1940 – 10.07.1940.
Alix, Princess of Ligne (Princesa Alix do Luxemburgo). Casa Santa Maria and Chalet Posser de Andrade, 25.06.1940 – 10.07.1940.
Duke and Duchess of Windsor. Home of Ricardo Espírito Santo, Cascais, 03.07.1940 – 31.07.1940.
Umberto II (Umberto Nicola Tommaso Giovanni Maria di Savoia), last King of Italy, who lived in Cascais for 37 years.

See also
Portugal during World War II
Aristides de Sousa Mendes
History of the Jews in Portugal
Vilar Formoso Fronteira da Paz

Further reading

References

Museums in Lisbon District
Jews and Judaism in Portugal
Museums established in 1999
1999 establishments in Portugal